Langsdorfia forreri is a moth in the family Cossidae first described by Herbert Druce in 1887. It is found in Mexico and Honduras.

References

Hypoptinae